Kniman is an unincorporated community in Jasper County, Indiana, in the United States.

History
Kniman was founded in 1887 by H. Kniman, and named for him. A post office was established at Kniman in 1888, and remained in operation until it was discontinued in 1936.

References

Unincorporated communities in Jasper County, Indiana
Unincorporated communities in Indiana